Whittlesey was a rural district in the Isle of Ely from 1894 to 1926.  It was created by the Local Government Act 1894 based on the Whittlesey rural sanitary district, and consisted of one civil parish – Whittlesey Rural.

The parish and district entirely surrounded the urban district of Whittlesey, which contained the parish of Whittlesey Urban.

The parish and district were both abolished in 1926, becoming part of the Whittlesey urban district and parish.

References

Districts of England created by the Local Government Act 1894
History of Cambridgeshire
Rural districts of England
Rural District